Mathias Feller (12 October 1904 – 16 June 1953) was a Luxembourgian footballer. He played in fifteen matches for the Luxembourg national football team between 1924 and 1934.

References

External links

1904 births
1953 deaths
Luxembourgian footballers
Luxembourg international footballers
Place of birth missing
Association football defenders
CA Spora Luxembourg players
Olympic footballers of Luxembourg
Footballers at the 1924 Summer Olympics
Footballers at the 1928 Summer Olympics